Matyukino is a rural locality (a village) in Posyolok Nikologory, Vyaznikovsky District, Vladimir Oblast, Russia. The population was 6 as of 2010.

Geography 
Matyukino is located 28 km southwest of Vyazniki (the district's administrative centre) by road. Abrosimovo is the nearest rural locality.

References 

Rural localities in Vyaznikovsky District